Auffay is a former commune in the Seine-Maritime department in the Normandy region in northern France. On 1 January 2019, it was merged into the new commune Val-de-Scie.

Geography

Heraldry

Population

Places of interest
 The collegial church of Notre-Dame, dating from the eleventh century.
 The eighteenth-century stone cross.
 The seventeenth-century château du Bosmelet.

Twin towns
  Bleckede, Germany since 1977
  Monreal del Campo, Spain

See also
Communes of the Seine-Maritime department

References

External links

 Auffray Tourist office website 

Former communes of Seine-Maritime